Peacock bass or Brazilian tucunaré are large freshwater cichlids of the genus Cichla. These are diurnal predatory fishes native to the Amazon and Orinoco basins, as well as rivers of the Guianas, in tropical South America. They are sometimes referred to in English by their Brazilian name tucunaré or their Spanish name pavon. Despite the common name and their superficial similarity, they are not closely related to other fish known as bass, such as the North American largemouth bass (Micropterus salmoides).

Peacock bass are important food fish and also considered valuable game fish. This has resulted in their accidental (escapees from fish farms) or deliberate (release by fishers) introduction to regions outside their native range, both elsewhere in South America, and in warm parts of North America and Asia. Singles have been caught elsewhere, including Australia, but do not appear to have become established there. Where established as an introduced species, they may become invasive and damage the ecosystem because of their highly predatory behavior, feeding extensively on smaller native fish.

Other peacock bass species are smaller. They are sometimes kept in aquariums, but even the smaller species require a very large tank.

Taxonomy and species
Following a taxonomic review published in 2006, 15 Cichla species are recognized by FishBase:

In addition, possibly undescribed species of peacock bass are known from the Travessão and Paru Rivers in Brazil.

Traditionally, only five peacock bass were recognized, but in the review in 2006, nine new species were described and C. nigromaculata was revalidated. In general, the various species are similar in proportions and most meristics, but differ in colour pattern (and range). This is similar to other diurnal cichlids, where visual clues play an important role in the behavior, including breeding. The speckled or three-barred peacock bass (C. temensis) in particular has caused problems due to its extensive variation, but the speckled pattern has now been shown to be present in nonbreeders and the three-barred when breeding. Although minor variations are known from adults of other peacock bass species, none shows the extreme variation of the speckled/three-barred peacock bass.

A genetic study published in 2012 has cast doubt on the validity of some of the species recognized in the review in 2006. Aside from limited hybridization among many species, in both natural and human-altered environments, several species do not show sufficient differentiation to imply reproductive isolation and/or a history of independent evolution. Among the species implicated as probable "good" species were C. intermedia, C. orinocensis, C. temensis, C. melaniae, C. mirianae, and C. piquiti. The other species were suggested to be part of two widespread meta-species or species complexes, called Cichla pinima sensu lato (including C. jariina, C. thyrorus, and C. vazzoleri) and C. ocellaris sensu lato (including C. monoculus, C. nigromaculata, C. pleiozona, and C. kelberi). In contrast, a genetic study published in 2007 suggested that two of those demoted taxa, C. monoculus and C. pleiozona, are valid species (this study lacked samples from some of the more localized proposed species).

A 2020 study described a new species, C. cataractae.

The peacock bass genus Cichla has been placed by some authorities as the only genus in the monogeneric tribe Cichlini.

Common names

Many common names are used for these fish in Brazil, the country of their largest native region. The most popular of these is tucunaré. In Spanish, the generic common name for these cichlids is pavόn. Pavón, in Spanish, means "peacock", while the Brazilian name comes from Tupi, an indigenous language of Brazil, meaning "friend of the tree", as this peacock bass usually stays close to submerged trees to hunt and to protect itself and its nests.

Description

Most display a color pattern based on a theme of three wide vertical stripes on their bodies, sometimes with smaller intermediate bands, only a grey, brown, yellow, or green background. They also exhibit a spot on their tail fins that resembles the eyes on a peacock's tail feathers—a feature which resulted in their common names (this "ocellus" is a common feature of South American cichlids, and is thought to deter predators and fin-biting piranhas). In addition, many adult fishes (primarily males, but also some females) develop a pronounced hump on their foreheads (nuchal hump) shortly before and during the rainy season, when the fishes generally spawn. Other physical traits can vary greatly, depending on the species, individual, and stage of development. These include dark rosettes instead of stripes, light speckles, and impressive shades of bright green, orange, blue, and gold. Very young fish exhibit dark horizontal stripes down half (C. orinocensis, C. ocellaris, et al.) or the whole (C. temensis, C. pinima, et al.) body.

Conservation status
The IUCN has not investigated the conservation status of any peacock bass species. Therefore, they do not appear on its red list. Some of the species have relatively small distributions, and C. melaniae is restricted to the lower Xingu River in an area that will be heavily affected by the Belo Monte Dam.

As gamefish

Sport fishermen have made these cichlids prized game fish for their fighting qualities, so much so that many travel agencies now arrange fishing trips to Brazil and Florida specifically to catch peacock bass.

Renowned American peacock bass fisherman and fishing author, Larry Larsen, refers to them as "freshwater bullies" due to their ferocious nature when hunting and their tendency to damage and sometimes destroy fishing gear when striking.

The most common techniques for catching these cichlids are similar to those for catching largemouth bass, with the notable exception that peacock bass usually will not strike artificial worms, a widely used lure among largemouth bass fisherman. In addition, fly fishing techniques, including lures such as poppers and large streamers, are becoming increasingly popular for catching them.

Introductions

Invasive species
Peacock bass have been identified as invasive species and cause of ecological imbalances in some of their introduced areas.

Peacock bass introduction in the Rosana Reservoir and upper Paraná River, both in Brazil, resulted in a 95% decline in native fish density and 80% decline in richness in only two years.

Few measures can protect native fish once peacock bass have been introduced. Reduction in native species' richness in lakes with introduced peacock bass was observed in all of the Gatun-area lakes, regardless of the presence of macrophyte refugia. After initial increases in abundance, introduced peacock bass often deplete local prey and resort to cannibalism.

In Panama's Gatun Lake
Cichla cf. ocellaris was introduced into Panama via a freshwater creek in the Rio Chagres drainage region unintentionally in the late 1950s (experts are not certain of the exact date). A well-known aquarist and medical doctor began raising peacock bass in a small pond in his back yard for sale as aquarium fish. Within a year, heavy rains flooded the pond, causing some fry to escape into a nearby creek which drained into Gatun Lake. By 1964, the lake and nearby rivers and creeks were overrun with the cichlids, providing sport fishing opportunities that had not existed previously. Since then, C. cf. ocellaris has become the dominant sport fish species in the area.

The presence of peacock bass in Panama has caused significant damage to the native fish assemblage, by eliminating seven of eleven previously common fish species, and significantly reducing three others. Local extinctions and a decrease in abundance of many species led to cascading second-order effects on zooplankton and tertiary consumer communities. Malaria incidence was reported to have risen significantly in the area around Gatun following the elimination of prey fishes that had previously kept the mosquito population at lower levels. This is an example of how species introductions can have explicit consequences for human health.

In Florida
In 1984, after 10 years of study, Florida officials deliberately introduced butterfly peacock bass and speckled peacock bass to the southern region of that state to prey on other non-native species, including the oscar (Astronotus ocellatus), Midas cichlid (Amphilophus citrinellus), and spotted tilapia (Tilapia mariae). Their introduction also provided additional sport fishing opportunities for anglers. While the butterfly peacock bass has flourished in Florida, the speckled peacock bass has not. Therefore, it is now illegal to kill or possess speckled peacock bass in Florida.  The butterfly peacock bass tends to flourish in the canals and fresh waterways throughout south Florida.

Because of their tropical origins, peacock bass cannot tolerate low water temperatures. This has prevented them from becoming abundant in Florida outside of Palm Beach, Broward, and Miami-Dade Counties. However, reports of them have extended to other counties in South Florida such as Collier, Lee County, Florida, and Hendry counties. Especially near Alligator Alley.

Aquaculture
Tilapia farmers sometimes keep peacock bass to eat any spawn that occur among their fish, in addition to eating any invasive fish that pose a threat to young tilapia (e.g. sunfish, piranha).  Spawning and brood-raising reduce the growth rate of the tilapia, so introduction of Cichla is thought to maintain a high growth rate in the tilapia.

They are also raised commercially for the aquarium trade. Asia is one of the main sources for aquacultured peacock bass.

Peacock bass prey on any species that catches their eye, but those in which they seem most interested are tilapia, crayfish, tadpoles, mosquitofish, minnows, and guppies. Also, they will eat their own young when other fish are scarce.

Eating quality
Their eating quality is very good. Their flesh is white and sweet when cooked, and has very little oil, making it similar in taste to snapper or grouper. Also, they are not excessively bony. However, most professional American anglers recommend practicing catch and release for these species to protect their numbers in the United States. To help ensure this, Florida Fish and Wildlife Conservation Commission officers strictly enforce bag limits for these fish.

References

External links

 Gatun Lake

Cichlid fish of South America
Cichlid genera
Recreational fishing
Taxa named by Marcus Elieser Bloch
Taxa named by Johann Gottlob Theaenus Schneider
Cichlinae